Bakhshabad may refer to:
 Bakhshabad, Chaharmahal and Bakhtiari
 Bakhshabad, Semnan
 Bakhshabad, Razavi Khorasan
 Bakhshabad, South Khorasan